The Feud is a lost 1919 American silent drama film directed by Edward LeSaint and starring Tom Mix. It was produced and distributed by the Fox Film Corporation.

Cast
Tom Mix as Jere Lynch/John Smith
Eva Novak as Betty Summers/Betty Brown
Claire McDowell as Mary Lynch
J. Arthur Mackley as William Lynch
John Cossar as Horace Summers
Mollie McConnell as Mrs. Summers
Lloyd Bacon as Ben Summers
Joseph Bennett as Cal Brown
Jean Calhoun as Ray Saunders
Frank Thorne as Bob Lynch
Guy Eakins as Dan Lynch
Sid Jordan as Bill Brady
Nelson McDowell as McFadden
Lucretia Harris as Nancy, The Negro Mammy

uncredited
Buck Jones

See also
1937 Fox vault fire
Tom Mix filmography

References

External links

1919 films
American silent feature films
Fox Film films
Films directed by Edward LeSaint
Lost American films
American black-and-white films
Silent American drama films
1919 drama films
1919 lost films
Lost drama films
1910s American films
1910s English-language films
English-language drama films